The events of 1998 in anime.

Events
May 20, 1998 - Animax, a Japanese anime satellite television network, is created

Accolades  
At the Mainichi Film Awards, Doraemon: Nobita's Great Adventure in the South Seas won the Animation Film Award and Mizu no Sei Kappa Hyakuzu won the Ōfuji Noburō Award.

Releases

Deaths 
 Yoshifumi Kondō
 Kazuo Harada
 Shigezō Sasaoka

See also
1998 in animation

External links 
Japanese animated works of the year, listed in the IMDb

1998 in animation
1998 in Japan
Years in anime